George Jackson dos Santos Souza (born 5 January 1987), known as George Jackson, is a Brazilian football player.

Club career
He made his professional debut in the Cypriot First Division for Ayia Napa on 2 September 2012 in a game against Omonia.

References

1987 births
Living people
Footballers from Rio de Janeiro (city)
Brazilian footballers
C.D. Tondela players
Ayia Napa FC players
Cypriot First Division players
Louletano D.C. players
Association football defenders
Brazilian expatriate footballers
Expatriate footballers in Portugal
Brazilian expatriate sportspeople in Portugal
Expatriate footballers in Cyprus
Brazilian expatriate sportspeople in Cyprus